The Zoé Vallé Memorial Library is a library in Chester, Nova Scotia, Canada that was established in 1928.  The library was the home of long-time summer resident Marie Zoé Vallé Lightfoot (1849–1926).  She was from St. Louis, Missouri (and also had a home in Bordeaux, France). She died in Nova Scotia and is buried in the Bellefontaine Cemetery, St. Louis.

Her sister Isabel Austen gave Zoe's home to the people of Chester to be used as a library in memory of Zoé.  The Chester branch of the Women's Institute of Nova Scotia ran the library in her home for over 50 years. The library has a history of notable supporters. The library was neglected from 1978 until it was researched and restored in 1994. The library remains open to the public.  On the grounds of the library are an extensive flower garden and the Chester Trust Lightfoot Tower.

It is supported by charitable donations to the Zoe Valle Lightfoot Endowment Fund which is managed by a Board of Trustees and administered by the Municipality of Chester.

Supporters 
 William Lyon Mackenzie King – prime minister of Canada
 Sir Christopher Ondaatje – author and business person
 John Grier Hibben – president of Princeton University
 Cyrus Eaton – philanthropist and business person
 John Gardner Murray – the sixteenth presiding bishop of the Episcopal Church
Robert S. Brookings – married Zoe's niece

See also
 List of historic places in Lunenburg County, Nova Scotia

References 

Buildings and structures in Lunenburg County, Nova Scotia
Libraries in Nova Scotia
Libraries established in 1928
1928 establishments in Canada